Nemanja Ivanov (born 6 October 1994) is a Serbian footballer who plays as a defender for GFK Dubočica.

References

External links

1994 births
Living people
Serbian footballers
FK Sileks players
FC Lyubimets players
FK Atlantas players
PFC Slavia Sofia players
FC Lokomotiv 1929 Sofia players
First Professional Football League (Bulgaria) players
A Lyga players
Expatriate footballers in Bulgaria
Expatriate footballers in Lithuania
Expatriate footballers in Slovenia
Association football defenders